Jaime Errázuriz Zañartu (3 August 1923 – 15 January 2011) was a Chilean alpine skier. He competed at the 1948 Winter Olympics and the 1952 Winter Olympics.

References

1923 births
2011 deaths
Chilean male alpine skiers
Olympic alpine skiers of Chile
Alpine skiers at the 1948 Winter Olympics
Alpine skiers at the 1952 Winter Olympics
People from Talca Province
20th-century Chilean people